Thannithode  is a village in Pathanamthitta district in the state of Kerala, India. It is near Konni town and is mainly a plantation township.
The famous Adavi Eco tourism is situated in Thannithode. Coracle boat journey (Kuttavanchi),cottage in forest,trekking etc. are available.

Demographics
 India census, Thannithode had a population of 14352 with 7005 males and 7347 females.

References

Villages in Pathanamthitta district